Omowunmi Dada  (born 10 October 1989) is a Nigerian actress, best known for her role as Folake in the M-Net television series Jemeji. She was also cast in the 2017 Yoruba language film Somewhere in the Dark, which won the award for Best Indigenous Film at the 2017 AMVCA Awards, and for which she received a nomination for Best Actress in a Supporting Role (Yoruba) at the Best of Nollywood Awards in 2017. In 2018, Dada played the voice of the titular character in Nigeria's first animation full-length feature film, Sade.

Omowunmi Dada is also a voice-over artist, presenter, and model. The talented actress aspires to be a movie director and producer someday. Also, she is a brand ambassador for Jumia Nigeria.

Early life
Dada was born in Lagos State, where she attended Ifako International Nursery and Primary School for her primary education, during which time, she became a member of the Yoruba Cultural Troupe; she went on to attend Command Day Secondary School, Oshodi, for her secondary education and studied Creative Arts at the University of Lagos.

Career
Dada began her acting career, taking small parts in stage plays while at the university. Her first major stage performance was in the play Moremi Ajasoro, which was directed by Femi Oke. In 2013, she began her movie career with a role in the film Oya alongside veteran Nigerian actor Tunji Sotimirin, she then went on to feature in other notable films including the Kunle Afolayan directed Omugwo alongside Patience Ozokwor and Ayo Adesanya.

Dada has featured in several Television series, including the EbonylifeTv series Married to the Game, Best Friends and Dere an African Adaptation of Disney's "Cinderella ". She also features in the M-net Television series Jemeji and has had roles in Tinsel, So Wrong so Wright, Needles Eyes and Bella’s Place amongst others.

In 2017, Dada featured in the critically acclaimed stage production, Isale Eko, a stage play, which was adopted as part of the activities sanctioned by the government of Lagos state to celebrate the 50th anniversary of the creation of Lagos State.

In 2018, Dada was cast in the titular role of Sade, in Nigeria's first full-feature length Animation movie titled SADE which was set for release in 2019.

Dada featured in Tunde Kelani’s film, Ayinla, alongside Kunle Afolayan and Lateef Adedimeji.

In December 2017, she was nominated as the Best Actress for the Year in Nigeria by award-winning Nigerian filmmaker and critic, Charles Novia.

Dada is an Ambassador for Daivyan children Cancer Foundation that advocates for the awareness and support for children living with cancer. She is also an Ambassador for Brian Wotari Foundation that is focused on engaging and enriching lives of youths.

In 2021, Dada played the role of an investigative journalist, Halima Abdul in the Psalm Oderinde directed short film Rebirth, produced by Chris Odeh of Sozo Films for Homevida Masterclass, and written by Thecla Uzozie and Dawn Ntekim-Rex.

At the 8th edition of Africa Magic Viewers Choice Awards in 2022, she won the Best Supporting actress category for the movie Country Hard.

Filmography

Selected feature films
The Gods are Still Not To Blame (2012)
Ojuju (2014)
The Antique (2015)
Somewhere in the Dark (2016)
Yes I Don't (2016)
Omugwo (2017)
Bias (2017)
King Invincible (2017)
Something Wicked (2017)
Chatch-er (2017)
The Ghost and the Tout (2018)
Just Before I do (2018)
Oga Bolaji (2018)
Like Dominoes (2018)
The Family (2019)
Diamonds in the Sky (2019)
Òlòtūré (2019)
Zena (2019)
The Man Who Cuts Tattoos (2019)
Nightcrawlers (2020)Sessions (2020)Reach (2020)Finding Hubby (2020)Bedroom PointsCity of Bastards (TBA)
The Blood Covenant
Country Hard
King Invincible
Elesin Oba, The King's Horseman (premiers in September 2022)

Short filmsNot RightMirabel (2018)Losing My Religion (2018)Fourth Side (2019)Rebirth (2022)

Television series
Jemeji
Tinsel
So Wrong So Wright
Needles Eyes
Tales of Eve
Taste of Love
Casino
Game On
The Wages - 2013
Married To The Game- MTTG – 2014 
Love, Lies & Alibi– 2014
Alone– 2018
Shuga– 2019

Animations
Sade (TBA)

Select stage plays
Isale Eko 2
Oya
For the Love of Country
Nigeria the Beautiful
Vision of St Bernadette
Death and the Kings Horsemen
Trials of Brother Jero

Awards and nominations

References

Nigerian television actresses
Living people
Actresses from Lagos
University of Lagos alumni
21st-century Nigerian actresses
Yoruba actresses
1989 births
Actresses in Yoruba cinema
Nigerian female models
Nigerian film actresses
Nigerian film producers